is a Japanese snack food made by the Kadō (菓道) company of Ibaraki Prefecture. It consists of balls of corn about 3 cm in diameter flavoured with small pieces of nori and Japanese brown sauce. It is a relatively low cost snack aimed at children. It is sold in two bag sizes, a 20 yen and a 100 yen bag. The package shows a frog wearing a policeman's hat. Despite the name, the snack does not list cabbage in its ingredients. Its name may be a pun on Momotaro.

See also 
 List of Japanese snacks

References

External links 
Page in Japanese, shows bag and contents

Japanese snack food